Toyçayırı is a village in the District of Haymana, Ankara Province, Turkey.

Population  
As of 2017 there are 212 inhabitants in the village of Toyçayırı, down from 499 inhabitants in 1985. The village is populated by the Kurdish Modan tribe.

References

Villages in Haymana District

Kurdish settlements in Ankara Province